Torch Lake is an approximately  lake lying mostly within Torch Lake Township with portions within Osceola and Schoolcraft townships in Houghton County in the U.S. state of Michigan. The lake is fed by the Traprock River.

The village of Lake Linden at the north end of the lake was once the site of the largest copper milling operation in North America. About  of copper mill stamp sands were dumped into Torch Lake itself, filling about 20 percent of the lake's volume.

A channel drains from the lake south into Torch Bay, which opens into Portage Lake.

See also
List of lakes in Michigan

External links
Torch Lake (Houghton County) Superfund Site information from the EPA
Torch Lake (Houghton County) Area of Concern information from the EPA

References

Bodies of water of Houghton County, Michigan
Lakes of Michigan
Superfund sites in Michigan